Group 1 of the 1950 FIFA World Cup took place from 24 June to 2 July 1950. The group consisted of Brazil, Mexico, Yugoslavia, and Switzerland. The group winners advanced to the final round.

Standings

Matches
All times listed are local time.

Brazil vs Mexico

Yugoslavia vs Switzerland

Brazil vs Switzerland

Yugoslavia vs Mexico

Brazil vs Yugoslavia

Switzerland vs Mexico

For this match, Mexico wore the shirts provided by EC Cruzeiro.

References

External links
 1950 FIFA World Cup archive

1950 FIFA World Cup
Brazil at the 1950 FIFA World Cup
Mexico at the 1950 FIFA World Cup
Switzerland at the 1950 FIFA World Cup
Yugoslavia at the 1950 FIFA World Cup